"What Made You Say That" is the debut single by Canadian singer Shania Twain, from her 1993 eponymous debut album. The song was written by Tony Haselden and Stan Munsey, Jr. The song was recorded and released earlier by country singer and actor Wayne Massey as a song from his album Wayne Massey and Black Hawk in 1989, then covered by Twain and was released to radio in March 1993, and was not much of a hit, though it did garner some attention because of its controversial-at-the-time video. Twain had the chance to perform the song at the 1993 Canadian Country Music Awards. The song also helped her win the Rising Star award in 1993, from CMT Europe. Several years later on Twain's Come On Over Tour, every night a local child who won a contest would be able to perform the song during the show, in front of everyone, with Twain performing backing vocals. One such rendition was by, a then-unknown, Canadian pop rock singer Avril Lavigne.

Critical reception
Billboard magazine reviewed the song as "sassy, buoyant, catchy, and supported by an alluring video."

Music video
The music video for "What Made You Say That" was shot at Miami Beach, Florida and directed by Steven Goldmann. It was filmed on January 12, 1993, and released on February 5, 1993, on CMT. The video featured Twain dancing around on the beach with her love interest. The video is available on Twain's 2001 DVD The Platinum Collection.

Chart performance 
"What Made You Say That" debuted on the Billboard Hot Country Singles & Tracks chart the week of March 27, 1993 at number 74. It spent 18 weeks on the chart and climbed to a peak position of number 55 on May 15, 1993, where it remained for two weeks.

Releases 
US 7" single (1993)  Mercury 864-992
"What Made You Say That"
"Crime of the Century"

US cassette single (1993)  Mercury 862 992-4

Side 1
"What Made You Say That"
Side 2
"You Lay a Whole Lot of Love on Me"

References

1993 debut singles
Shania Twain songs
Music videos directed by Steven Goldmann
Mercury Records singles
Songs written by Stan Munsey
Songs written by Tony Haselden
1993 songs
PolyGram singles
Mercury Nashville singles